Crateromys is a genus of rodent, native to the Philippines, in the family Muridae. It contains four species extant species, and one extinct species.
 Dinagat bushy-tailed cloud rat (Crateromys australis)
 Giant bushy-tailed cloud rat (Crateromys schadenbergi)
 Panay cloudrunner (Crateromys heaneyi)
 Ilin Island cloudrunner (Crateromys paulus)
Crateromys ballik

References

 
Rodents of the Philippines
Rodent genera
Taxa named by Oldfield Thomas
Taxonomy articles created by Polbot
Crateromys